The Youth Pledge was a declaration made on 28 October 1928 by young Indonesian nationalists in the Second Youth Congress. They proclaimed three ideas: one motherland, one nation and one language.

Background

The first Indonesian youth congress was held in Batavia, capital of the then-Dutch East Indies in 1926. It produced no formal decisions but did promote the idea of a united Indonesia. The idea are Indonesian dream of independence become dream of all Indonesian youth and all youth organization  empowered efforts to mobilize youth organizations in one forum. The situation at the time was tense because Dutch colonial authority have just crushed the joint rebellion between communists and religious groups in Cilegon, Banten, and West Sumatra. Wage Rudolf Supratman in preparation, composed and recorded the song "Indonesia" ( prototype of "Indonesia Raya" ) with the help of Yo Kim Tjan owner of Toko Populaire, musical store in Pasar Baru, after rejected by Dutch-owned Firma Odeon and Tio Tek Hong, owner of a vinyl store in Pasar Baru, in fear of Dutch authority. The music was recorded secretly in Yo Kim Tjan house near bilangan Gunung Sahari in 1927.

In October 1928, the second Indonesian youth congress was held in three locations. In the first session held on 27 October 1928 in the Katholieke Jongelingenbond building, the hope was expressed that the congress would inspire the feeling of unity. The second session saw discussions about educational issues held in Oost Java Bioscoop building. In the third and final session on 28 October, it was held at Jalan Kramat Raya No, 106, which was a house owned by Sie Kong Lian, this event was closed by the hearing of the future Indonesian national anthem Indonesia Raya by Wage Rudolf Supratman played with violin, and sang by Haji Agus Salim's daughter, Theodora Atia "Dolly" Salim, but was modified slightly to not provoke Dutch authority.

The congress closed with a reading of the youth pledge.

The pledge
In Indonesian, with the original spelling, the pledge reads:
Pertama
Kami poetra dan poetri Indonesia, mengakoe bertoempah darah jang satoe, tanah air Indonesia.
Kedoea
Kami poetra dan poetri Indonesia, mengakoe berbangsa jang satoe, bangsa Indonesia.
Ketiga
Kami poetra dan poetri Indonesia, mendjoendjoeng bahasa persatoean, bahasa Indonesia.
In Indonesian with current spelling:
Pertama
Kami putra dan putri Indonesia, mengaku bertumpah darah yang satu, tanah air Indonesia.
Kedua
Kami putra dan putri Indonesia, mengaku berbangsa yang satu, bangsa Indonesia.
Ketiga
Kami putra dan putri Indonesia, menjunjung bahasa persatuan, bahasa Indonesia.

In English:
Firstly
We the sons and daughters of Indonesia, acknowledge one motherland, Indonesia.
Secondly
We the sons and daughters of Indonesia, acknowledge to be of one nation, the nation of Indonesia.
Thirdly
We the sons and daughters of Indonesia, uphold the language of unity, Indonesian.

First Congress of Indonesian Youth 

 Chairman: Sugondo Djojopuspito (Perhimpunan Pelajar-Pelajar Indonesia/PPPI)
 Vice Chairman: R.M. Djoko Marsaid (Jong Java)
 Secretary: Mohammad Yamin (Jong Soematranen Bond)
 Treasurer: Amir Sjarifuddin (Jong Batak Bond)
 Aide I: Johan Mohammad Cai (Jong Islamieten Bond)
 Aide II: R. Katjasoengkana (Pemoeda Indonesia)
 Aide III: R.C.I. Sendoek (Jong Celebes)
 Aide IV: Johannes Leimena (Jong Ambon)
 Aide V: Mohammad Rochjani Su'ud (Pemoeda Kaoem Betawi)

National Day 
As of Presidential Decree No. 316 of 1959 dated December 16, 1959, 28 October became non-holiday national day.

See also 

 Youth Pledge Museum

References
 Hudaya Latuconsina & Dedi Rafidi (1996) Pelajaran Sejarah untuk SMU Jilid 2 (History for Senior High School Vol. 2). Penerbit Erlangga, Jakarta, 
 Kahin, George McTurnan (1952) Nationalism and Revolution in Indonesia Cornell University Press, 
 Ricklefs (1982), A History of Modern Indonesia, Macmillan Southeast Asian reprint, 
 Youth Pledge Museum website (Indonesian)

Notes

Indonesian National Awakening